Cartoonists Rights Network International (CRNI) is a non-profit organisation created in 1999 in the United States by Dr. Robert "Bro" Russell. It looks to protect the human rights and creative freedom of social and editorial cartoonists.

CRNI "envisions a world where cartoonists are free from persecution and able to use their creativity as a powerful tool for communication" and "CRNI strengthens the interconnectedness of cartoonists around the world, campaigns to protect their human rights and defends those threatened as a result of their work."

Robert Russell Courage in Editorial Cartooning Award 
Since its foundation in 1999, CRNI has presented a $1000 annual Courage in Editorial Cartooning Award "to a cartoonist who is in great danger or has demonstrated exceptional courage in the exercise of free speech rights, or both". The award was named after CRNI's founder Robert Russell on its retirement in 2019.

Laureates

References

External links 
 

Freedom of speech in the United States
Editorial cartooning